Master L. Cz. (active c. 1480–1505) was an anonymous late 15th-century German Renaissance printmaker. Only twelve engravings by his hand are extant, but their virtuosity establishes him as a talented artist whose work marks a stylistic transition between that of Martin Schongauer and Albrecht Dürer.

Identity 

19th-century scholars supposed that Master L. Cz. was a Dutch goldsmith by the name of Corneliszoon, as one of his few engravings is a design for an elaborate piece of jewelry, and z. is a Dutch abbreviation for zoon, meaning "son of". This theory was eventually rejected on the basis of his painterly style and German iconography, and the father of Lucas Cranach the Elder was proposed as another possibility. When it was discovered that Cranach's father's name was Hans Maler, Cranach himself was suspected.

While the identification with Cranach is still occasionally repeated, Master L. Cz. today is most often associated with the anonymous artist known as the Master of the Strache Altar, to whom four paintings of passion scenes have been ascribed. This artist has been identified with a fair amount of certainty as Lorenz Katzheimer, a Bamberg painter. Lorenz was probably a relative of Wolfgang Katzheimer, another Bamberg artist whose works show marked similarities to those of the Master of the Strache Altar.

Work 

Twelve engravings by Master L. Cz. are extant; of these, ten are signed, and only two are dated. These works display the influence of Master E. S., the Housebook Master, and especially Martin Schongauer. While the earlier prints are more derivative of Schongauer, later prints, especially The Temptation of Christ, show a mature artist working in his own style.

The evolution of Master L. Cz.'s style can be broadly outlined through an examination of his engravings. Lady with a Servant in a Meadow (c. 1480–85) is an example of his earliest, least sophisticated work, in which the figures and drapery are "stiff", "arbitrary" renditions of Schongauer's more elegantly drawn women, and the stylized landscape the figures inhabit is derived from the work of Master E. S. Other early works show that L. Cz. soon began to move away from the "all-purpose medieval foliage" of Master E. S., placing the figures in Two Women on a Bridge and St. George and the Dragon (both c. 1485–90) in relatively naturalistic landscapes. Despite this development, Master L. Cz.'s engraving technique in the early works remained "harsh" and "severely methodical".

In the middle period Master L. Cz.'s technique became increasingly sophisticated as he continued to experiment with the integration of figures into landscape backgrounds. In Maiden Taming the Unicorn (dated 1492) the figures are deftly drawn and clearly stand out from the dense natural growth around them, as opposed to the earlier St. George and the Dragon, where the dense over-application of cross-hatching on the figures seems to flatten them into the background. The Sudarium Supported by St. Peter and St. Paul, his only other dated work (1497), is also from this period.

The final period includes only two engravings, The Temptation of Christ and Entry into Jerusalem, but these are Master L. Cz.'s best and largest works. In contrast to the awkwardness of his early works Master L. Cz. now displayed "enormous virtuosity with the burin in creating varied effects of texture".

The Temptation of Christ is his most famous and common print, existing in about 20 impressions. It draws inspiration from the compositions of Michael Pacher and Master E. S., but marks a step forward from these models by integrating the monumental confrontation between good and evil into a fully realized landscape setting apparently observed from nature. In particular, the design of Satan recalls the demons from Schongauer's The Torment of St. Anthony while providing a notable precedent for Albrecht Dürer's depiction of the devil in Knight, Death, and the Devil.

Beyond providing specific models for later artists, the sheer size, ambition, and technical inventiveness of Master L. Cz.'s late work suggests his most important contribution: that he "developed a new concept of engraving as a medium capable of rivaling painting."

List of works
The dates given are those according to Shestack.

Citations

References 
 

 Lehrs, Max. (1922) "The Master LCz" in: Print Collector's Quarterly, vol. 9., No. 1 London. On Google Books.

External links 
 
 
 Entry for Master L. Cz. on Artcyclopedia
 Collection of work from the National Gallery of Art

Renaissance engravers
German engravers
Anonymous artists
15th-century German artists
16th-century German artists
15th-century engravers